Karlík is a municipality and village in Prague-West District in the Central Bohemian Region of the Czech Republic. It has about 500 inhabitants.

History
The first written mention of Karlík is from 1253.

References

Villages in Prague-West District